RX Soori is a 2015 Indian Kannada romantic crime drama film directed and written by Sreejay, making his debut direction. It stars Duniya Vijay, Akankshaa and P. Ravi Shankar. The film is produced by Suresh of Govindaya Namaha fame. The music was composed by Arjun Janya. The film marks the acting debut for the lead actress Akankshaa. The principal photography of the film began in August 2014, and the film was released on 4 September 2015.

According to the media reports, the film is based on the life story of Std. Kumara, a gangster in the Karnataka province of Bangalore, Avalahalli.

Cast
 Duniya Vijay as Soori
 Akankshaa
 P. Ravi Shankar as Paritala Ravi
 Adi Lokesh
Manju Prabhas 
Patre Nagaraj 
 Vinaya Prasad
 Bullet Prakash
 Sadhu Kokila
 Avinash
 Shobhraj
Mico Nagaraj 
Rajeev Gowda 
Prashanth Siddi 
 Thulasi Shivamani

Soundtrack
The soundtrack is composed and written by Arjun Janya. D-Beats, a company owned by musician V. Harikrishna has bought the audio rights of the film. Popular vocalist K. J. Yesudas has recorded a song for the film and this is his first song with the composer.

Track listing

References

External links

RX Soori updates at Sandalwoodking

2015 films
2015 crime drama films
Indian gangster films
Films scored by Arjun Janya
2010s Kannada-language films
2015 directorial debut films
Romantic crime films